Larissa Ping Liew (born 18 March 1999) is a Malaysian model, fashion blogger and beauty pageant titleholder, who was crowned Miss World Malaysia 2018. She represented Malaysia at Miss World 2018 pageant, where she placed in the Top 30.

Personal life 
Larissa was born and raised in Kuching, Sarawak. Her father is Malaysian Chinese while her mother is Kenyah, an indigenous tribe in the Borneo Island. Ping is fluent in English, Bahasa Melayu, as well as the Sarawakian Malay dialect.

She studied at the St. Joseph's Private School, Kuching during her secondary school years and scored straight A's in her SPM. She finished her foundation in arts at HELP University. She was awarded 100% School Achiever Scholarship Award (SASA) totaling RM 20,000 for her foundation programme which she completed in 2018, scoring 8 High Distinctions and 5 Distinctions.

In 2019, Larissa enrolled in the University of Malaya to further her undergraduate studies in Law.

Pageantry

Keligit Orang Ulu Miri 2018
Larissa was crowned the winner of Keligit Orang Ulu for Miri Division in May 2018. The pageant is held annually in conjunction with the Gawai Dayak festival.

Miss World Malaysia 2018 

Larissa was crowned as Miss World Malaysia 2018 pageant as well as winning the Miss Talent and Miss Photogenic awards at the Borneo Convention Centre Kuching in Sarawak on 8 September 2018. She succeeded outgoing Miss World Malaysia 2016, Shweta Sekhon.

Miss World 2018 

After a year of absence, Larissa represented Malaysia at the Miss World 2018 pageant held in China on 8 December 2018. She was placed in the Top 30. Other than being in the quarter-finalist, she was placed in some of the events that occurred during the pageant week:

 Winner Head to Head challenge in Round 1 and 2
 Fourth runner-up in Miss World Talent,
 Top 5 in Best Designer Award, 
 Top 12 in Beauty with a Purpose,
 Top 10 in Multimedia Award,
 Top 30 in Swimsuit music video,
 Top 32 in Miss World Top Model.

Filmography

Music videos

Humanitarian works
Larissa is an avid advocate for children's education, spends her free time teaching Myanmar refugee children at Zomi Education Centre in Malaysia. In 2018, she spearheaded the "Indigenous Digital Outreach Programme", together with Sarawak Multimedia Authority (SMA) and The Champions Kuching at SK Long Seridan, Marudi, Sarawak. The project facilitated the setup of a computer lab, restocking the school library and replacing some of the ceiling fans and lights.

Awards
 Herald Global's Most Admired Leaders Of Asia - Beauty Pageant: 2019

References

External links

1999 births
Living people
Miss World 2018 delegates
People from Sarawak
Malaysian female models
Malaysian beauty pageant winners
Malaysian people of Chinese descent
Kenyah people